Star Wars: Battlefront is a series of first- and third-person shooter video games based on the Star Wars franchise. Players take the role of characters from the franchise in either of two opposing factions in different time periods of the Star Wars universe. The series was launched in 2004 by LucasArts with Star Wars: Battlefront, developed by Pandemic Studios for LucasArts. The game received positive reviews and sold well. In 2005 Pandemic developed a sequel, Star Wars: Battlefront II, which was also critically and commercially successful. 

The games were followed by Star Wars Battlefront: Renegade Squadron (2007) and Star Wars Battlefront: Elite Squadron (2009) for handheld game consoles and Star Wars Battlefront: Mobile Squadrons (2009) for mobile devices. LucasArts made several attempts to develop a third major Battlefront game but no projects were released before The Walt Disney Company's acquisition of LucasArts. Subsequently, EA DICE acquired a license to develop a new game, titled Star Wars Battlefront which was released on November 17, 2015. A sequel, Star Wars Battlefront II, was released on November 17, 2017, and was developed by EA DICE, Criterion Games, and Motive Studio.

Gameplay

Games in the Battlefront series normally revolve around two armies – the Galactic Republic versus the Confederacy of Independent Systems or the Galactic Empire versus the Rebel Alliance or First Order versus the Resistance – fighting each other on various maps. Maps take place in the Star Wars galaxy, with battlezones varying in theme and size. Across the battlefield are multiple "command posts" (objectives) that act as spawn points, and can be controlled by either the player or the computer.  Units can spawn from any friendly command post, and vehicles regularly spawn at their respective command posts when destroyed. Units can capture neutral or hostile command posts by approaching them and standing within the immediate vicinity for about 30 seconds. The time to capture quickens with more friendly units within the capture zone. Some vehicles act as mobile command posts, and must be destroyed as they can not be captured. On some maps (such as Hoth or Endor), certain structures also act as command posts that can not be captured. Command post capturing works differently on certain campaign missions as well.  Playable heroes and villains play a significant role in changing the course of battles.

The objective of most matches is to eliminate all of the opponents' reinforcement tickets or to capture the command points, to slowly chip away at their tickets. Reinforcement tickets are used whenever a unit is killed, or when one faction controls a majority of the command posts on the map (usually when the losing faction only has 2-3). Only one objective needs to be completed. When all command posts are captured, the team with no command posts has twenty seconds to recapture or neutralize an enemy command post. If the team cannot take over a post in this time, the match is over. Certain campaign levels and multiplayer have requirements that differ from the general game play, however the general structure remains the same. The game's "Conquest" mode is vaguely based on the Battlefield game mode of the same name.

Playable characters 
Numerous characters from the movies, TV series and other games have been available to play as, which include:

Development
The first console games of the series were developed by Pandemic Studios, and since 2015, a second series of console Battlefront games has been developed by EA DICE. Battlefront II (2017) is the first in the series to accurately follow the canon of the films, while the games developed by Pandemic Studios were relegated to Star Wars Legends non-canonical status, along with all of the games in the series released before November 2015.

Star Wars: Battlefront (Pandemic Studios)

Star Wars: Battlefront

Star Wars: Battlefront is the first installment in the Battlefront series. It was released on September 21, 2004, with a Mac port by Aspyr released in July 2005. The game is available on Microsoft Windows, PlayStation 2, Xbox, Mac OS, and mobile phones. Jedi are not playable in this game without the help of modified files unsupported by LucasArts. Other NPCs made playable by similar files include, but are not limited to, Tusken Raiders in the Dune Sea of Tatooine, Ewoks of Endor and Gungans on the Naboo plains.

Star Wars: Battlefront II

Star Wars: Battlefront II is the second installment in the Battlefront series, released in Europe on October 31, 2005 – for the PlayStation 2, PSP, Xbox, and Windows – and in North America one day later. There are some significant differences between Battlefront and Battlefront II. Battlefront II includes playable Jedi characters, space battles, and story campaigns, as well as Star Wars: Episode III – Revenge of the Sith-related content. The release date of Battlefront II coincided with the release of Revenge of the Sith on DVD.  The game is now an Xbox Platinum Hits game, a Sony Greatest Hits game in North America, and an Xbox Classics and PlayStation Platinum game in Europe.

Battlefront II expands upon the original game's single-player experience with mission-based objectives drawn from the first six Star Wars films. It has a story-based campaign which revolves around the 501st Legion (AKA "Vader's Fist") and its evolution from a legion of clone troopers serving the Republic during the Clone Wars to Imperial stormtroopers. Many maps from Star Wars Battlefront make a second appearance, and the game adds new locales such as Coruscant and Utapau. The game also introduces "heroes" – playable characters based on iconic characters from the Star Wars films who are much more powerful than regular soldier (and were also present in the original Battlefront, but only as NPCs that spawned randomly on the battlefield); the hero roster includes Luke Skywalker, Han Solo, Leia Organa, Chewbacca, Obi-Wan Kenobi, Yoda, Mace Windu, Ki-Adi Mundi and Aayla Secura (as well as Kit Fisto, available only on the Xbox version of the game via the Xbox Live patch), whereas the villain roster includes Darth Vader, Darth Sidious, Boba Fett, Count Dooku, General Grievous, Darth Maul, Jango Fett, and Anakin Skywalker (as well as Asajj Ventress, also available only via the Xbox Live patch). There are more modes in this game, such as Conquest, Hunt (where players fight as natives on planets against other natives or certain troopers in an army, such as Wampas vs. Rebels on Hoth or Tusken Raiders vs. Jawas on Tatooine, to earn 50 points first), Capture the Flag (both with one and two flags), Assault (which, on Tatooine only, is also available as Heroes vs Villains, where one team plays as the heroes and the other one as the villains in a race to rack up points by defeating enemies) and space battles.

Canceled sequels

Star Wars: Battlefront III
On September 29, 2006, Computer and Video Games made an unconfirmed claim that Free Radical Design was developing the third game in the Star Wars: Battlefront series, titled Star Wars: Battlefront III. In June 2008, Kotaku allegedly received information from a former LucasArts employee that Star Wars: Battlefront III was in the creation process. On October 2, Activision Blizzard filed a classification with the Australian Office of Film and Literature Classification listing Star Wars: Battlefront III for the Nintendo DS with a PG rating (E10+ equivalent) for mild animated violence. However, that same month, Free Radical Design announced that they lost the rights to develop Star Wars: Battlefront III; the game at that point had been in development for two years. Several years later, Free Radical Design co-founder Steve Ellis said Battlefront III was "pretty much done" in 2008, but that it was effectively canned when LucasArts could not commit to "spend big" on marketing it. However, GameSpot quoted an unnamed LucasArts employee involved with the project who said Free Radical could not devote sufficient resources to the game and regularly missed deadlines. A former Free Radical Design employee said some of the technology Free Radical developed for the game, specifically the contiguous game environment from planet surface into space, "is dying with us".

During and after the game's development, screenshots, and gameplay footage became accessible to the public. In December 2008, Star Wars character renders bearing a Battlefront III watermark surfaced from a laid-off Free Radical employee. The following month, gameplay footage was leaked from a November 2008 Free Radical in-house showing of Battlefront III footage. The footage was pulled from IGN after LucasArts demanded its removal. On April 1, 2012, a user on the game journalist website Betagames discovered Star Wars models and textures buried in Resident Evil: Operation Raccoon Citys archives; PC Gamers Tom Senior speculated that these could have been from Battlefront III. Also in April 2012, Past to Present revealed pre-alpha footage of Free Radical Design's Battlefront III. YouTube videos showing the game's rough state received media attention from outlets such as Joystiq, Kotaku, and Shacknews.

Star Wars: Battlefront Online
Star Wars: Battlefront Online was rumored to be the next installment in the series. On January 28, 2010, Kotaku reported that SOCOM developer Slant Six Games was working with LucasArts to develop an online-only Battlefront title due in 2011. The game was said to be released for the Xbox 360 and PlayStation 3. It was also stated that this game may have been the source of the Star Wars: Battlefront 3 concept art renders. However, the game has been canceled after the studio was unable to meet its 2010 release deadline.

Star Wars: First Assault and Version Two
Star Wars: First Assault was to be a downloadable multiplayer shooter for Xbox Live Arcade. Digital Trends speculated that Star Wars: First Assault might help LucasArts recover some of their previous investment in Battlefront III and other projects in the franchise.  Speaking to Kotaku an anonymous insider noted that the game was to be "step zero" towards a third Battlefront game.  When footage of the game was leaked onto YouTube Tech site TechnoBuffalo noted that the gameplay very closely resembled that of the Call of Duty franchise. Alongside First Assault, LucasArts was also working on a separate game titled "Version 2", which was, reportedly, a code name for Battlefront III.

Star Wars Battlefront IV
In 2018, concept art surfaced of a canceled Battlefront IV, rather than attempting to fit within the previous games and films' continuity, concept art showed the game was meant to focus on an alternate reality where Obi-Wan Kenobi and Luke Skywalker fell to the dark side, instead of Anakin Skywalker.

Handheld and mobile only games

Star Wars Battlefront: Renegade Squadron

Star Wars Battlefront: Renegade Squadron is a handheld game released in North America on October 9, 2007, and in Europe three days later. The game was released only for the PlayStation Portable. Renegade Squadron is also available in a bundle pack with the then-new white PSP redesign featuring Darth Vader on the back.

Aside from new heroes and vehicles, such as the Millennium Falcon, a new feature is the ability to create a character, allowing the player to adjust the character's features such as weapon, appearance, and speed. However, the character will be vulnerable due to the lacking of certain aspects that will be replaced by others. For example, the character may be fast but weak or have good weapons but no stamina and speed. Before the game's release, LucasArts had stated that over one million different customizable options would be present. Another new feature allows players to enter asteroid bases on some space maps.

Commander Col Serra describes the forming of Renegade Squadron in the beginning cutscene of campaign. Then the player starts a series of missions ranging in objectives while including cut scenes between each mission. The final mission includes the Battle of Endor, in which the objectives are similar to the footage of Return of the Jedi.

Star Wars Battlefront: Elite Squadron

Star Wars Battlefront: Elite Squadron was released on November 3, 2009, for the PlayStation Portable and the Nintendo DS. This marks the third Battlefront game on the PlayStation Portable and the first on a Nintendo console. The game was originally discovered through its ESRB rating on the official ESRB website which has since been taken down. It follows in the same vein as its predecessors with space, land and new air battles. Elite Squadron is most notable for featuring simultaneous space and ground battles in Instant Action, and is the only game in the series with this feature. Players usually play in a third person perspective, but in the PSP version, they can also switch to a strategy based mode where they may build troops and upgrade armies.

Star Wars Battlefront: Mobile Squadrons
Star Wars Battlefront: Mobile Squadrons is a mobile game developed by THQ Wireless. It was released on April 2, 2009. The game features a persistent online community, and has three character classes. The gameplay is a first person perspective shooter that can use the touch features of a phone, although the player has no control over movement.

Star Wars Battlefront (EA DICE)

Star Wars Battlefront (2015)

At an Electronic Entertainment Expo (E3) press conference on June 10, 2013, EA DICE (whose parent company, Electronic Arts, had recently acquired a multi-year license to produce Star Wars video games), unveiled a teaser trailer for a new Star Wars: Battlefront game, built on the Frostbite 3 engine. The teaser showed a first-person view of the Battle of Hoth, including a crashing Snowspeeder and the foot of an AT-AT. DICE showed additional development footage at the 2014 E3 conference. The game's title was eventually announced as Star Wars Battlefront. In April 2015, EA announced a release date of November 17, 2015 at Star Wars Celebration. The game is a reboot of the series, focusing on capturing the look of the films. At launch, four planets were confirmed - Hoth, Tatooine, Endor, and Sullust. Unlike its predecessors, Star Wars Battlefront does not feature the Clone Wars era found in the prequel films, nor does it feature content from The Force Awakens; as a result, the hero and villain roster is also limited, at launch including only Luke Skywalker, Han Solo, Leia Organa, Darth Vader, Emperor Palpatine, and Boba Fett. Free downloadable content (DLC) for the game was released in December 2015, featuring the planet of Jakku with two new maps and a new multiplayer game mode. The game also features both first and third-person gameplay perspectives, similar to its predecessors. A gameplay trailer involving the Hoth battle debuted at E3 on June 15, 2015. The game features a pseudo-campaign  a cooperative experience allowing the player to experience gameplay with one or two players and computer-controlled allies and opponents.

"Outer Rim" is the first DLC pack for the game and was released on March 22, 2016. It adds new heroes Nien Nunb and Greedo to the game, four new maps set in Jabba the Hutt's Palace (Palace Garage and Jabba's Palace) on Tatooine and a factory area on Sullust (Sorosuub Refinery and Sorosuub Pipelines), and a new mode called "Extraction". The DLC is available for free to all players who have purchased the game's Season Pass, otherwise costing $10. The second expansion pack is titled "Bespin" and allows players to fight in the setting of Cloud City, released in September 2016. The expansion added more maps along with an additional game mode titled sabotage and new heroes Lando Calrissian and Dengar. The third expansion pack, titled "Death Star", was released in September 2016 as well and added the long-awaited Death Star to the game, along with new heroes Chewbacca and Bossk.  The fourth and final DLC pack was released on December 6, 2016. It is based on characters and locations from the film Rogue One, and includes Jyn Erso and Orson Krennic as new playable heroes, and a new game mode set both above and on the planet Scarif.

Star Wars Battlefront II (2017)

Blake Jorgensen of Electronic Arts mentioned a sequel in November 2016, and Star Wars Battlefront II was announced in March 2017. The game was released on November 17, 2017. Since the restructuring of the Star Wars canon, Battlefront is the first game with a storyline that is considered canonical to the film series.

Star Wars Battlefront II features both single-player and multiplayer game modes, a customizable character class system, and content based on all Star Wars movies up to Star Wars: The Rise of Skywalker (with content for the other movies, as well as television series being added later on via free DLC). A Celebration Edition was released in December 2019. DICE announced that Scarif from Rogue One would be the last content update released for the game.

Canceled spin-off 
In 2019, EA was in the process of developing a game code-named Viking, designed as a spin-off of the Battlefront series with open-world elements. The game was originally planned for release in fall 2020, coinciding with the next generation of video game consoles, but was canceled in late 2019.

Cultural impact

Fan-made sequel games

Galaxy in Turmoil  
On January 25, 2016, Frontwire Studios began an attempt to produce an unofficial Battlefront installment called Galaxy in Turmoil. The fan made game was in production using Unreal Engine 4 and was based on the canceled Star Wars: Battlefront III by Free Radical Design. Although early versions of the game contained assets from Free Radical Design, they soon became "place holders" as the full game planned to be released using assets and music made from the ground up. On June 4, 2016, Galaxy in Turmoil gained a distribution deal through Valve and was planned to be released for free on Steam which generated a fair amount of attention.

On June 22, 2016, Lucasfilm requested the production of Galaxy in Turmoil be halted.  On July 31, 2016, Frontwire Studios announced the cancellation of the game was due to the "possibility of Galaxy in Turmoil taking away attention from Electronic Arts's Battlefront franchise". Proposals of Galaxy in Turmoil falling under the paywall of Electronic Arts, and ideas of Lucasfilm giving Frontwire Studios a Star Wars license were both rejected due to an agreement between Electronic Arts and Lucasfilm. Although Frontwire Studios may have fallen within Fair Use laws, legal conflict was avoided and the project was canceled. There is a playable alpha that contains assets from Free Radical Design that was released to the public then removed early within Galaxy in Turmoils lifetime. Galaxy in Turmoil is now planned to be redeveloped as a brand new cyberpunk-themed IP without any Star Wars references, but still with Battlefront III-inspired mechanics including space-to-ground battles.

On March 23, 2022, Frontwire Studios announced that they had cancelled development on the game, citing a lack of funds, as well as the team going their own separate ways. The Frontwire Studios name had lapsed, though someone re-registered the name on March 19 and put up a rough version of the old website.

See also
List of Star Wars video games

References

External links

 
First-person shooters
Free Radical Design
Electronic Arts franchises
Electronic Arts games
LucasArts games
LucasArts franchises
Multiplayer online games
Third-person shooters
Video game franchises
Space opera video games
Aspyr games
Video game franchises introduced in 2004